Curva  (plural: curve ) is an Italian term or name for curved stands of seating located at sports stadiums, particularly in Italy; so named, originally, due to their curved or bending shape. The curva plays an integral part in the culture of Ultras and European football.

Composition

The majority of stands referred to as a "curva" are located behind the goals in their respective stadiums and contain the most vocal supporters within them, often known as Ultras. They are usually curved in shape, in some form whether minor or major, often due to the presence of a running track around the pitch. The Stadio Giuseppe Meazza provides an example of two prominent stands referred to as "curva", "Curva Nord" and "Curva Sud", which contain only minor curves at their corners, while the Stadio Olimpico provides an example of two completely curved stands. A curva may extend from one corner flag to another or be located centrally behind the goal, bordered by two separate corner sections for ticketing or organizational purposes.

Significance

Being home to the most openly passionate supporters in a stadium, the curva is usually the focal point of a club's support. It is often the scene of dramatic choreographed displays of support and occasionally, disapproval for a team or club. These displays often take on an importance of their own, particularly in games involving rivals where both sets of supporters aim to outdo each other. In certain countries, particularly those where sports clubs and supporters are extremely reflective of the local culture, the curva can become quite politicised in nature. Therefore, it is not uncommon for a curva to be split into individual factions or groups, either solely or partially, based on politics, and for one group to hold significant control of the curva and its inhabitants on match days. Ultras groups within a curva often benefit from this degree of relative uniformity, when there are issues regarding supporters' rights and the commercialisation of sports and football in particular.

Locations

Algeria

Austria

Bulgaria

Bosnia and Herzegovina

China

Croatia

Cyprus

Denmark

Egypt

England

Finland

France

Germany

Greece

India

Indonesia

Ireland

Italy

Malaysia

Malta

Morocco

Netherlands

North Macedonia

Philippines

Poland

Portugal

Romania

Russia

Scotland

Serbia

Spain

Sweden

Switzerland

Tunisia

Turkey

Ukraine

See also

Ultras
Major football rivalries
Spion Kop

References

Specific

General

Testa, A. and Armstrong, G. (2008). "Words and actions: Italian ultras and neo-fascism" Social Identities, vol. 14 (4), pp. 473 – 490
Testa, A. (2009) "UltraS: an Emerging Social Movement", Review of European Studies, vol. 1 (2), 54–63
Testa, A. (2010). Contested Meanings: the Italian Media and the UltraS. Review of European Studies, vol 2(1), 15–24
Testa, A. and Armstrong, G. (in press; November 2010). Football, Fascism and Fandom: The UltraS of Italian Football, A&C (Bloomsbury), London, Black Publishers.

Association football terminology
Italian words and phrases